Journal of Legislation is a scholarly journal published by Notre Dame Law School.

It is a legislative law review which focuses on analysis and reform of legislation and public policy. It was founded in 1971 as New Dimensions in Legislation, before being renamed as N.D. Journal of Legislation in 1974 and finally just Journal of Legislation in 1976.

The Journal typically publishes two issues every year, with each issue usually comprising two to three articles from independent contributors on legislation or policy, and three to four staff-written notes. Occasionally, it also publishes briefer commentaries on legislative articles that have appeared in previous or concurrent issues. The Journal is financially self-sufficient, independently organized and completely student-run.

Notable contributors
U.S. Sen. Barry M. Goldwater, 
U.S. Sen. Christopher Dodd, 
U.S. Rep. Richard A. Gephardt,  
U.S. Rep. Jack Kemp,  
Gov. Michael S. Dukakis,  
U.S. Rep. Bob Barr,  
U.S. Sen. Rick Santorum, 
U.S. Rep. Peter T. King,

References

External links

American law journals
Notre Dame Law School
Law journals edited by students
English-language journals
Publications established in 1971
Law and public policy journals
University of Notre Dame academic journals